William Cavendish, 1st Duke of Devonshire,  (25 January 164018 August 1707) was an English soldier, nobleman, and Whig politician who sat in the House of Commons from 1661 to 1684 when he inherited his father's peerage as Earl of Devonshire.  He was part of the "Immortal Seven" group that invited William III, Prince of Orange to depose James II of England as monarch during the Glorious Revolution, and was rewarded with the elevation to Duke of Devonshire in 1694.

Life
Cavendish was the son of William Cavendish, 3rd Earl of Devonshire, and his wife Lady Elizabeth Cecil. After completing his education he made the customary tour of Europe, and then in 1661, he was elected Member of Parliament for Derbyshire in the Cavalier Parliament. He was a Whig under Charles II of England and James II of England and was  leader of the anti-court and anti-Catholic party in the House of Commons, where he served as Lord Cavendish. In 1678 he was one of the committee appointed to draw up articles of impeachment against the Lord Treasurer Lord Danby.

He was re-elected MP for Derbyshire in the two elections of 1679 and in 1681. He was made a privy councillor by Charles II, but he soon withdrew with his friend Lord Russell, when he found that the Roman Catholic interest uniformly prevailed. In January 1681 he carried up to the House of Lords the articles of impeachment against Lord Chief Justice William Scroggs, for his arbitrary and illegal proceedings in the court of King's bench, and later when the king declared his resolution not to sign the bill for excluding the duke of York (afterwards James II), he moved in the House of Commons that a bill might be brought in for the association of all his majesty's Protestant subjects. He also openly denounced the king's counsellors, and voted for an address to remove them. He appeared in defence of Lord Russell at his trial, and after the condemnation he gave the utmost possible proof of his attachment by offering to exchange clothes with Lord Russell in the prison, remain in his place, and so allow him to effect his escape.

The famed political philosopher Thomas Hobbes spent the last four or five years of his living at Chatsworth House, owned by the Cavendish family, and died at another Cavendish estate, Hardwick Hall in December 1679. He had been a friend of the family since 1608 when he first tutored an earlier William Cavendish.

In 1684 he succeeded to the peerage as Earl of Devonshire on the death of his father and then sat in the House of Lords. He opposed the arbitrary acts of James II until his enemies found an excuse to neutralize him; after an imagined insult by a Colonel Colepepper, Cavendish struck his opponent and was immediately fined the enormous sum of £30,000. He was unable to pay and was briefly imprisoned until he signed a bond (which was eventually cancelled by King William). The earl went for a time to Chatsworth House, where he occupied himself with the erection of a new mansion, designed by William Talman, with decorations by Antonio Verrio, James Thornhill, and Grinling Gibbons.

Cavendish was a strong supporter of the "Glorious Revolution" of 1688 which brought William III of Orange to the throne, signing as one of the Immortal Seven the invitation to William. On the occasion of the coronation he was awarded the Order of the Garter.
After the revolution, Cavendish was a leading Whig, serving as William's Lord Steward, and was created the Duke of Devonshire (1694) and also Marquess of Hartington in recognition for his services. His last public service was assisting to conclude the union with Scotland, for negotiating which he and his eldest son, the marquis of Hartington, had been appointed among the commissioners by Queen Anne.

Cavendish was given an honorary M.A. by the University of Cambridge in 1705. The year before he had ended the successful career of the singer and dancer Mary Campion. She is thought to have given her last performance on 14 March 1704 (and she may have been the daughter of one of his servants). Cavendish installed her as his mistress at Bolton Street in Westminster despite already having several mistresses already, a number of children by them and of course Lady Mary Butler, his wife. They had a child named Mary Anne Cavendish before Mary Campion died of a fever on 19 May 1706. Cavendish surprised many by having her buried in the family church in an extravagant tomb. He did not attend her funeral and he died, some say in repentance, the following year.

Family
Cavendish married Lady Mary Butler (1646–1710), daughter of James Butler, 1st Duke of Ormonde and his wife, Lady Elizabeth Preston, on 26 October 1662. They had four children:
 Lady Elizabeth Cavendish (1670–1741), married Sir John Wentworth, 1st Baronet of North Elmsall, and had issue
 William Cavendish, 2nd Duke of Devonshire (4 June 1729)
 Lord Henry Cavendish (167310 May 1700)
 Lord James Cavendish (died 14 December 1751)

See also
 List of deserters from James II to William of Orange

References

 

|-

1640 births
1707 deaths
Cavendish, William Cavendish, Lord
101
Cavendish, William
William Cavendish, 01st Duke of Devonshire
Garter Knights appointed by William III
Lord High Stewards
Lord-Lieutenants of Derbyshire
Lord-Lieutenants of Nottinghamshire
Lord-Lieutenants of Somerset
Members of the Privy Council of England
17th-century soldiers
English MPs 1661–1679
English MPs 1679
English MPs 1680–1681
English MPs 1681
People from Derbyshire Dales (district)
People of the Glorious Revolution